Khadija Ciss (born March 26, 1983) is a Senegalese former swimmer, who specialized in long-distance freestyle events. She won a bronze medal in the 200 m freestyle at the 2003 All-Africa Games in Abuja, Nigeria (2:09.00).

Ciss qualified for two swimming events at the 2004 Summer Olympics in Athens, by achieving FINA B-standard entry times of 2:05.51 (200 m freestyle) and 9:02.54 (800 m freestyle) from the EDF Swimming Open in Paris. In the 200 m freestyle, Ciss challenged five other swimmers on the second heat, including two-time Olympian Vesna Stojanovska of Macedonia. She rounded out the field to last place and fortieth overall by a 4.42-second margin behind winner Jana Myšková of the Czech Republic in 2:09.04. In her second event, 800 m freestyle, Ciss ended her Olympic run in twenty-ninth place with a slowest time of 9:20.06.

References

1983 births
Living people
Senegalese female swimmers
Olympic swimmers of Senegal
Swimmers at the 2004 Summer Olympics
Senegalese female freestyle swimmers
Sportspeople from Dakar
African Games bronze medalists for Senegal
African Games medalists in swimming
Competitors at the 2003 All-Africa Games